The Philippines is set to participate at the 2021 Asian Youth Para Games which will be held in Manama, Bahrain from 2 to 6 December 2021. The Philippine contingent has 20 athletes who will compete in six sports.

Swimmer Ariel Joseph Alegarbes won  a gold medal in the S14 100m butterfly and 2 silver medals in SB14 backstroke and breaststroke events, para-athlete Ronn Russel Mitra clinched silver in the 400m T20 event and Linard Sultan earned a silver medal in para table tennis after he lost to Iran's Seyed Hosseinipour in the men's singles class 8 finals.

Competitors

Medalists

Athletics
Three sportspeople competed in athletics for the Philippines, all under the T20 classification:

Ronn Russel Mitra
Remie Rose Flores 
Daniel Enderes

Badminton
The Philippines has two competitors in badminton
Antonio dela Cruz Jr.
Joseph Clyde Belga

Boccia
One athlete competed in boccia for the Philippines.

John Iver Quintaña (BC1 class)

Table tennis
Two players took part in the table tennis for the Philippines.
Linard Sultan 
Mary Eloise Sable

Swimming
Swimmers formed the largest part of the Philippine delegation to the games with five athletes competing in swimming.
Angel Mae Otom (S6)
Ariel Joseph Alegabres (S14)

Wheelchair basketball
The wheelchair basketball team of the Philippines has 10 members in its roster.
Mark Aguilar
Mark Marquez
Kyle Carandang
Eljay Lamata
Jolleniel Nebris
Andrei Kuizon
Jodriel Piol
John Carl Dedala
Anthony de Mesa
Edgardo Ochaves

Coaches: Vernon Perea and Harry Solanoy

References

2021
Asian Youth Para Games
Nations at the 2021 Asian Youth Para Games